The signal crayfish (Pacifastacus leniusculus) is a North American species of crayfish. It was introduced to Europe in the 1960s to supplement the North European Astacus astacus fisheries, which were being damaged by crayfish plague, but the imports turned out to be a carrier of that disease. The signal crayfish is now considered an invasive species across Europe, Japan, and California, ousting native species there.

Description and ecology

They are bluish-brown to reddish-brown in colour, with robust, large, smooth claws. They have a white to pale blue-green patch near the claw hinge, like the white flags that signalmen used for directing trains—hence the name.

The lifecycle of the signal crayfish is typical for the family Astacidae. Around 200–400 eggs are laid after mating in the autumn, and are carried under the female's tail until they are ready to hatch the following spring. The eggs hatch into juveniles, which pass through three stages (two moults) before leaving their mother. Sexual maturity is reached after 2–3 years, and the lifespan can be up to 20 years.

The signal crayfish is an omnivore, with most of its dietary intake being detritus.

Native range
The signal crayfish is native to North America west of the Rocky Mountains, including the Canadian province of British Columbia, and the U.S. states of Washington, Oregon, and Idaho. It was introduced to California in 1912 into the San Lorenzo River watershed and from there rapidly spread throughout the state. The only native crayfish remaining in California (aside from  Pacifastacus leniusculus klamathensis, a subspecies of signal crayfish believed to be native to the Klamath River in Northern California) is the Shasta crayfish, of Shasta County, California (Pacifastacus fortis), where efforts are being made to create a barrier to signal crayfish invasion. Within North America, it has also been introduced to Nevada, and the populations in Utah may be the result of introductions. It has also been found in Alaska, specifically Kodiak Island, in the Buskin River and Buskin Lake. It is listed as a species of least concern on the IUCN Red List.

Introduction into Europe

From 1907, crayfish plague, an infectious disease caused by the water mould Aphanomyces astaci, damaged stocks of the native European crayfish Astacus astacus. Since the signal crayfish occupied a similar ecological niche in its native range, it was imported in the 1960s to Sweden and Finland to allow recreational and commercial crayfish capture. At the time, the signal crayfish was not recognized as a carrier of the crayfish plague. All American species carry the infection, but it is only lethal to individuals that are already stressed; to European species, the infection is rapidly fatal.
The signal crayfish is now the most widespread alien crayfish in Europe, occurring in 25 countries, from Finland to Great Britain and from Spain to Greece. It was first introduced to Great Britain in 1976, and is now widespread across the British mainland as far north as the Moray Firth. It has also been observed on the Isle of Man, but not in Ireland, the last European country to have no alien crayfish.

In both Sweden and Finland (where crayfish are eaten), the catch of signal crayfish exceeds that of A. astacus (European/noble crayfish). The former is sold at roughly half the price compared to the latter.

In Europe, the signal crayfish is included since 2016 in the list of Invasive Alien Species of Union concern (the Union list). This implies that this species cannot be imported, bred, transported, commercialized, or intentionally released into the environment in the whole of the European Union. The signal crayfish is often considered a nuisance species amongst anglers in Europe.

Multiple studies have been published to find out how the damage caused by the settlement — and subsequent overpopulation — of invasive signal crayfish in Europe can be mitigated, including studies regarding effective upstream barriers against signal crayfish that don’t negatively impact the migration of fish, as well as other, aggressive but more efficient approaches which may harm an existing ecosystem further, such as eradication (by means of drainage or destruction of waterways, and biocides) and suppression (by means of extensive trapping, electrocution of waterways, and introduction of predatory fish), with eradication being most successful.

References

External links

Astacidae
Fauna of the Western United States
Freshwater crustaceans of North America
Edible crustaceans
Crustaceans described in 1852
Taxa named by James Dwight Dana